Gordon Frederick "Doggie" Kuhn (November 19, 1905 — July 29, 1978) was a Canadian professional ice hockey player who played nine games in the National Hockey League with the New York Americans during the 1932–33 season. The rest of his career, which lasted from 1924 to 1940, was spent in various minor leagues.

Kuhn was born in Truro, Nova Scotia.

Career statistics

Regular season and playoffs

External links
 

1905 births
1978 deaths
Buffalo Bisons (IHL) players
Canadian ice hockey right wingers
Ice hockey people from Nova Scotia
New Haven Eagles players
New York Americans players
People from Truro, Nova Scotia
Providence Reds players
Syracuse Stars (AHL) players